The Master Mystery is a 1918 American mystery silent serial film told in 15 installments. The film was directed by Harry Grossman and Burton L. King and written by Arthur B. Reeve and Charles Logue. The film stars Harry Houdini, Marguerite Marsh, Ruth Stonehouse, Edna Britton, William Pike, and Charles Graham. Episode 1 was released on November 18, 1918, by Octagon Films. It is one of the first films to feature a powered exoskeleton.

Plot
Justice Department agent Quentin Locke is investigating a powerful cartel that is protected by The Automaton, a robot. However, it uses a gas weapon known as The Madagascan Madness.

Cast
Harry Houdini as Quentin Locke 
Marguerite Marsh as Eva Brent
Ruth Stonehouse as Zita Dane
Edna Britton as De Luxe Dora
William Pike as Paul Balcom
Charles Graham as Herbert Balcom
Floyd Buckley as Q the Automaton
Jack Burns as Peter Brent

Episodes
Living Death
The Iron Terror 
The Water Peril
The Test
The Chemist’s Shop
The Mad Genius
Barbed Wire
The Challenge
The Madagascan Madness
The Binding Ring
The Net
The Death Noose
The Flash of Death
The Tangled Web
Bound at Last; or, Unmasking of the Automaton

References

External links

 
 

1919 films
1910s mystery films
1910s science fiction films
American silent serial films
1910s English-language films
American mystery films
Films directed by Burton L. King
American robot films
Harry Houdini
American black-and-white films
American science fiction films
Films with screenplays by Arthur B. Reeve
1910s American films
Silent mystery films
Silent science fiction films